is a Japanese footballer currently playing as a forward for FK Rudar Pljevlja of the Montenegrin First League.

Career
He scored his first hat trick against Balestier Khalsa on 27 May 2018.

Career statistics

Club

Notes

References

1995 births
Living people
Japanese footballers
Japanese expatriate footballers
Association football forwards
Singapore Premier League players
Montenegrin First League players
Albirex Niigata Singapore FC players
FK Rudar Pljevlja players
Japanese expatriate sportspeople in Singapore
Expatriate footballers in Singapore
Japanese expatriate sportspeople in Montenegro
Expatriate footballers in Montenegro